Desert War may refer to:
 
 Desert warfare
 Desert War (horse), an Australian Thoroughbred racehorse
 North African Campaign, during the Second World War
 The Desert War, in Egypt and Libya during the Second World War
 Western Desert Campaign, in Egypt and Libya during the Second World War